The Khlong Phasi Charoen Express Boat service operates an 11 kilometre route on the Khlong Phasi Charoen in Bangkok. The service has been in operation since 1 April 2016. It runs from Phet Kasem 49 Pier to Wat Paknam Phasi Charoen Pier. The Bangkok Metropolitan Administration (BMA) has built a walkway from Taksin-Phet Kasem Pier to Bang Wa Station of the BTS Skytrain.

See also
 Water transport in Bangkok

References

Water transport in Bangkok